Saint-Paul is a civil parish in Kent County, New Brunswick, Canada.

For governance purposes, most of the parish is within the town of Champdoré, with a strip along the northern boundary in the village of Five Rivers and the southeastern corner part of the incorporated rural community of Maple Hills. Champdoré and Five Rivers belong to the Kent Regional Service Commission, while Maple Hills belongs to the Southeast RSC.

Prior to the 2023 governance reform, the parish formed the local service district of the parish of Saint-Paul.

Origin of name
The parish may have taken its name from the Roman Catholic ecclesiastical parish.

History
Saint-Paul was erected in 1888 from all of Sainte-Marie Parish west of McLaughlin Road.

Boundaries
Saint-Paul Parish is bounded: 

on the north by the prolongation of a line running south 68º west from the mouth of the Rivière Chockpish-nord to the Canadian National Railway line running alongside Route 126;
on the east by Route 490;
on the south by the Westmorland County line;
on the west by the CNR line running alongside Route 126.

Governance
The entire parish forms the local service district of the parish of Saint-Paul, established in 1966 to assess for fire protection. Community services were added in 1987, recreational and sports facilities in 2008, and non-fire related rescue in 2015. First aid and ambulance services (1982–2008) were formerly included.

Communities
Communities at least partly within the parish; italics indicate a name no longer in official use

Birch Ridge
Bon-Secours
Gladeside
Hébert
Légerville
McLean Settlement
Saint-Paul

Sweeneyville
Terrains de L'Évêque
Val-Richard
Village-des-Belliveau
Village-des-Cormier
Village-des-Léger

Bodies of water
Bodies of water at least partly in the parish:
Buctouche River
Cocagne River
Lac de Bon-Secours

Other notable places
Parks, historic sites, and other noteworthy places at least partly in the parish.

 McLean Settlement Protected Natural Area

Demographics

Population
Population trend

Language
Mother tongue (2016)

See also
List of parishes in New Brunswick

Notes

References

External links
 Saint-Paul LSD

Local service districts of Kent County, New Brunswick
Geography of Kent County, New Brunswick